The Ski Trip is a 2004 LGBT independent romantic comedy movie written and directed by openly gay entertainer Maurice Jamal.  It was released on DVD on July 11, 2006.

Friends & Lovers: The Ski Trip 2
In 2008 a sequel to the original film was released with Jamal, Fleming, Cruz, and Rankin reprising their roles.  However, the sequel was never picked up by a distributor.

References

External links

2000 films
2004 romantic comedy films
American LGBT-related films
American romantic comedy films
2000 comedy films
2004 films
2000s English-language films
2000s American films